"Take You Back" is a song written and performed by Christian singer-songwriter Jeremy Camp. The song was the first radio single released in promotion of his third studio album, Restored. The single reached the No. 1 position on the Billboard Hot Christian Songs airplay chart.

"Take You Back" was also the 2005 live album Live Unplugged and the 2009 live album Jeremy Camp Live. "Take You Back" was also the compilation album WOW Hits 2006.

Charts

Weekly charts

Year-end charts

Decade-end charts

References

External links

2004 singles
Jeremy Camp songs
2004 songs
Songs written by Jeremy Camp